Asociación Civil Deportivo Lara (usually called A.C.D. Lara, Deportivo Lara or just Lara) is a professional football club based in Cabudare, Lara State, that was promoted to the Venezuelan league in 2009, in their first year of existence.

History
Club Deportivo Lara was born July 1, 2009 through the purchase of the club by some employers (Arid García, Luís Yépez, Juan Conde, Carlos Eduardo Hernández) and the former team had been struggling financially. This new policy for football betting in the Lara state and under the slogan "Believe in Lara."

The team achieved its first year stay in the top four of the cumulative overall, just behind Caracas, Deportivo Táchira and Deportivo Italia and, the latter being the worst hit since the last dates of the Apertura and Clausura was severed its aspiration in the hands of the team.

First international participation
On May 9, 2010 the team sealed its pass to the 2010 Copa Sudamericana, after being in 4th place in the 2008–09 first division, and so after 44 years to bring back an international tournament to Lara state after Lara FC did so in 1966 but this time in the Copa Libertadores.

ACD Lara played their first leg at home on August 17 against Colombia's Santa Fe in the Estadio Metropolitano de Cabudare with favorable outcome for the local 2–0, and the second leg was held in El Campín home of the Santa Fe in Bogotá on Thursday August 26. There, the club could not maintain its early lead and fell by the score of 4–0 leaving the competition with aggregate score of 4–2 in favor of Santa Fe.

Recent years
In December 2010 the club purchases coach German "Basílico" González, who brings a new coaching staff including Arturo Boyacá and Óscar  Gil as technical assistants. After poor results González leaves the club, and Óscar Gil takes the helm.

Gil took over the club in Week 14 against Estudiantes de Mérida in which he took the win 1–0 on the stadium Metropolitano de Cabudare, then faced Caroní in Cachamay winning 0–3, then a defeat at home to Monagas 1–3 and finally managed to finish the tournament with 0–4 in game played in Caracas. Previously, he had served as interim coach in the win against Yaracuyanos by a score of 1–4, which gave him one of the first joys to all ACD Lara fans.

But Gil decided not to go for the new season, although the Red & Black would not be too long without coach, since June 3, 2011 Eduardo Saragó coach signed for three seasons with the club. That same day it was made a press conference that inaugurated the new headquarters of the club. Also began a promising project, as it has taken in consideration the youth teams of the club, and also there have been transfers of experience as Miguel Mea Vitali, Edgar Pérez Greco, Rafael Castellín, David McIntosh, Vicente Suanno, José Manuel Rey, Norman Baquero, Marcelo Maidana, Bladimir Morales, and for a long-term project which made them long contracts.

After a dream season, the Red & Black managed to become overall champions of the 2011–12 Venezuelan Primera División after winning the Apertura 2011 unbeaten by winning to Mineros de Guayana with 5–1 score, and also winning the Clausura 2012 by winning again to Mineros de Guayana, this time by a score of 0–1. In this manner, the ACD Lara closes the season as the third team in Venezuelan football history to win both tournaments in a season (after Caracas managed to do so in 2003–04 and the Unión Atlético Maracaibo did it in 2004–05) and the first team to do so since the expansion of teams in 2007, with an accumulated score in the table of 25 wins, 8 draws and just 1 loss, accumulating 83 points (record of points obtained in a Venezuelan football season) obtaining a pass for the 2012 Copa Sudamericana and the 2013 Copa Libertadores.

Recent seasons

Titles
Primera División Venezolana
Amateur Era (0):
Professional Era (1): 2012

Segunda División Venezolana: 0
 :

Segunda División B Venezolana: 0
 :

Tercera División Venezolana: 0
 :

Copa de Venezuela: 0
 :

Performance in CONMEBOL competitions
Copa Libertadores: 3 appearances
2013: Group Stage
2018: Group Stage
2019: Group Stage

Copa Sudamericana: 3 appearances
2010: First Round
2012: First Round
2013: First Round

Recopa Sudamericana: 0 appearances
 :

Current squad

Out on loan

Managers
 Jaime de la Pava (July 1, 2007 – Dec 31, 2007)
 Germán González (Dec 14, 2010 – May 1, 2012)
 Eduardo Saragó (July 1, 2011 – Dec 12, 2012)
 Lenín Bastidas (Dec 24, 2012 – Dec 31, 2013)
 Rafael Dudamel (Dec 15, 2013–15)
 Alí Cañas (Ene 1– 2016 – July 26, 2017 )
 Leo González (July 31, 2017 – Dec 20, 2020)
 Martín Brignani (Jan 25, 2021 – )

See also
Venezuelan Primera División

References

External links
Official Site 

 
Association football clubs established in 2009
Football clubs in Venezuela
2009 establishments in Venezuela